Herr Seele, the pseudonym of Peter Van Heirseele (Torhout, Belgium, 13 April 1959), is a Flemish cartoonist, author, actor, piano tuner and piano collector.

He is mainly known for the absurd humor comic strip Cowboy Henk, for which his colleague Kamagurka writes the scripts, while he makes the drawings. The comic has been published in HUMO since 1981 with only a minor interruption from October 2011 until the spring of 2013. During this period Seele made another gag-a-day comic series Dikke Billie Walter. Since the spring of 2013 Cowboy Henk appears in the magazine again.

Biography
Van Heirseele was born in Torhout and attended the Sint-Jozefsinstituut. When he was sixteen, he went to the Ghent Academy for the Fine Arts, where he completed his high school years and followed a year in sculpting, after which he learned to tune and repair pianos at the Ystrad Mynach School in Wales.
He then went to Florence, Italy, where he learned how to renovate them.

Career
In 1981, he began drawing Cowboy Henk with Kamagurka, for the first time using the pseudonym of Herr Seele. Originally, the comic was intended for De Vooruit, but they soon became an exclusive item in HUMO.
Cowboy Henk was published in several countries, including Brazil (in a comics magazine named Animal), Scandinavia and the United States of America (RAW).

In 1983, Herr Seele starts acting for television, his first show being Sfeervol Bullshitten, which was written by Kamagurka.
It was followed in 1985 by a 20-part series, called Kamagurka en Herr Seele, written by the duo for the Dutch VPRO. After these first successes, other shows followed like Johnnywood, Wees Blij Met Wat Je Hebt, Lava and Bob & George. He has also made the radio show Studio Kafka with Kamagurka.

Piano Collection
Herr Seele owns one of the most renowned collections of early historic pianos in the world, which is stored at Ostend and contains over 200 instruments. He is also a piano tuner himself.

Album cover design
He designed the cover of "Steelt de Schouw!" (1994) for Pater Moeskroen.

References

External links

Belgian comics artists
20th-century Belgian painters
21st-century Belgian painters
Belgian stand-up comedians
20th-century Flemish male actors
Belgian cartoonists
Belgian male comedians
Belgian comedy musicians
Belgian radio presenters
Belgian surrealist artists
Flemish television presenters
Belgian male singers
People from Turnhout
Album-cover and concert-poster artists
Underground cartoonists
Piano tuners
1959 births
Living people
Raw (magazine)
21st-century Flemish male actors